Isojärvi may refer to:

 Isojärvi (Kuhmoinen), a lake in Finland
 Isojärvi (Satakunta), a lake in Finland
 Isojärvi National Park